Leinzell is a municipality in the German state of Baden-Württemberg, in Ostalbkreis district.

Mayors
1897–1921: Josef Rist
1921–1934: August Ohnewald
1934–1945: Anton Lang
1945–1946: Anton Ströbel
1945–1968: Gustav Vogt
1968–1974: Klaus Pick
1974–2006: Günter Nesper
2006–2022: Ralph Leischner
Since 2022: Marc Schäffler

References

Ostalbkreis